Oregon Ballot Measure 58 may refer to:

Oregon Ballot Measure 58 (1998), measure that restored the right of adopted adults to access their original birth certificates
Oregon Ballot Measure 58 (2008), measure to require "English immersion" in Oregon's public schools